The River Dane is a tributary of the River Weaver that originates in the Peak District area of England. The name of the river (earlier Daven) is probably from the Old Welsh dafn, meaning a "drop or trickle", implying a slow-moving river.

Course 
It forms the border between first Cheshire and Derbyshire on the west and east, and then between Cheshire and Staffordshire where it then flows north-west through Cheshire before meeting the Weaver in Northwich.

The river rises close to the source of the River Goyt just to the south west of Buxton, at Dane Head on Axe Edge Moor. Flowing southwest, it forms county borders for around  before flowing west through Congleton and past Holmes Chapel. The point on the river where the three counties meet, at Panniers' Pool Bridge, is called Three Shire Heads (sometimes Three Shires Head).

The River Dane is the longest, cleanest and thought to be the fastest flowing river through Cheshire. The route of the Dane is followed as closely as possible by the Dane Valley Way, a  walking route from Buxton to Northwich.

Although the main river is part of the Mersey catchment and flows into the Irish Sea, a portion of the water can be diverted via canal feeders into Rudyard Lake and subsequently the Caldon Canal. This water discharges eventually into the River Trent and ultimately into the North Sea, having crossed the English watershed.

Tributaries

 Gad Brook (R)
 Eldersbriar Brook (L)
 Puddlinglake Brook (R)
 River Wheelock (L)
 Hoggins Brook (L)
 Fowle Brook (L)
 River Croco (L)
 Sanderson's Brook (L)
 Small Brook (L)
 Swettenham Brook
 Midge Brook (Ls)
 Chapel Brook (R)
 Dighill Brook (R)
 Clonter Brook (Rs)
 Loach Brook
 Dairy Brook (L)
 The Howty (L)
 Dane in Shaw Brook (L)
 Biddulph Brook
 Timbers Brook (R)
 Cow Brook (R)
 Ravensclough Brook (L)
 Shell Brook (R)
 Clough Brook (R)
 Highmoor Brook (R)
 Rabb Brook (R)
 Oaken Brook (R)
 Cumberland Brook (L)
 Yarnshaw Brook (L)
 Correction Brook (L)
 Tor Brook (R)
 Black Brook
 Flash Brook (L)
 Far Brook (R)
 Robins Brook (R)
 Three Shires Brook (L)

History 

A tall red brick railway viaduct, built in 1841, spans the broad Dane Valley between Holmes Chapel and Twemlow. It has 23 arches and is a scheduled monument. It crosses the River Dane at Saltersford where Cheshire salt traders drove their horse-drawn carts through a ford along the toll road. Nearby downstream is the small stone Hermitage Bridge built in 1772. Some years the river floods widely across the meadows here.

In 1451 when the River Dane flooded in Congleton, it destroyed the town's corn mill, half of the timber-framed buildings and the wooden bridge over the river. To prevent it happening again, the river was diverted away from the town. Congleton's textile industry grew from the 14th century, with many water-powered mills built along the river by the 18th century.

Heading downstream: Dane Bridge, Hug Bridge, Lymford Bridge (early 19th century), Macclesfield Canal Aqueduct (1830), Congleton Railway Viaduct (West Coast Main Line, 1849), Colley Mill Bridge, Havannah Bridge (early to mid-19th century, originally leading to a cigar factory), Hermitage Bridge (1772), and Shipbrook Bridge are all Grade II listed.

See also

List of rivers of England

References

Rivers of Cheshire
Rivers and valleys of the Peak District
Sites of Special Scientific Interest in Cheshire
1Dane
Peak District